Gendi Khori-ye Sofla (also Romanized as Gendī Khorī-ye Soflá; also known as Gendī Khorī-ye Pā’īn) is a village in Tut-e Nadeh Rural District, in the Central District of Dana County, Kohgiluyeh and Boyer-Ahmad Province, Iran. At the 2006 census, its population was 489, in 101 families.

References 

Populated places in Dana County